Colasposoma perlatum is a species of leaf beetle of Angola and the Democratic Republic of the Congo. It was first described by the German entomologist Edgar von Harold in 1880.

References 

perlatum
Beetles of the Democratic Republic of the Congo
Taxa named by Edgar von Harold
Insects of Angola
Beetles described in 1880